Dominique Vlasto (born 14 August 1946 in Marseille) is a French politician who served as a Member of the European Parliament from 2000 until 2014. She is a member of the Union for a Popular Movement, which is part of the European People's Party.

In parliament, Vlasto served on the European Parliament's Committee on Industry, Research and Energy. She was also a substitute for the Committee on Transport and Tourism, and a member of the delegation to the Euro-Mediterranean Parliamentary Assembly.

Career
 Management assistant in a small clothing company (1965–1967)
 Worked at SOFRES (French opinion poll organisation) (1975–1979)
 Member of the France Congrès office (since 1995)
 Chairwoman of the Marseilles Tourist Office and administrator at the Marseilles International Fair limited company
 Member of Marseilles City Council (1983–1989) and district councillor in Marseilles (1989–1995)
 Deputy Mayor of Marseilles with responsibility for building permits and land rights (1995–1998)
 responsibility for tourism, conferences and festivals (since 1999)
 Member of the Committee of the Regions (1998–1999)
 Member of the European Parliament (since 2000)
 The Mayor of Marseilles' representative on the World Water Council
 Chairwoman of the regional association for women and families' activities and information (association under the auspices of the Provence-Alpes-Côte d'Azur Regional Council (1986–1998)
 Member of the administrative council of the Youth and Leisure Social Centre (Marseilles) (since 1997)

Decorations
 Knight of the Order of Merit (1995)

External links
 European Parliament biography
 Declaration of financial interests (in French; PDF file)

1946 births
Living people
Politicians from Marseille
Union for a Popular Movement MEPs
MEPs for France 1999–2004
MEPs for South-East France 2004–2009
MEPs for South-East France 2009–2014
20th-century women MEPs for France
21st-century women MEPs for France